Moroni, according to the Book of Mormon, was the last Nephite prophet, historian, and military commander who lived in the Americas in the late fourth and early fifth centuries. He is later known as the Angel Moroni, who presented the golden plates to Joseph Smith, who translated the plates upon which the Book of Mormon was originally written.

Early life
According to the Book of Mormon, Moroni was the son of Mormon, the prophet for whom the Book of Mormon is named. Moroni shares a name with Captain Moroni, a much earlier Book of Mormon figure, of whom Mormon wrote highly.

The Book of Mormon tells that Moroni served under his father, the commander in chief of 23 groups of about 10,000 Nephites each, who battled against the Lamanites. Upon the Nephites' defeat at Cumorah, Moroni was forced to go into hiding and to wander from place to place to avoid being killed by the Lamanites. Moroni was the last known survivor of the Nephite nation.

Moroni had been commanded by his father to complete the Nephite record, which Mormon had abridged from previous records. Moroni was the last prophet to write in the Book of Mormon.

Moroni then writes that he had spoken to Jesus and received extensive visions of the future. Speaking directly to modern-day readers of the Book of Mormon, Moroni writes, "Behold, I speak unto you as if ye were present, and yet ye are not. But behold, Jesus Christ hath shown you unto me, and I know your doing".

Upon completion of the record, written on golden plates, Moroni is said to have buried the plates in a stone box in a hill in what is now Wayne County, New York, from where Joseph Smith reported that he recovered them; a 12-m granite and bronze monument to Moroni has been placed by the Church of Jesus Christ of Latter-day Saints on this hill.

Afterlife

In Latter Day Saint belief, Moroni was resurrected after his death and became an angel who directed Joseph Smith to the location of the buried golden plates in the 1820s.

See also
 Moroni, Utah named for him.

References

Further reading

References to Moroni2, Index, Book of Mormon (LDS edition)

External links

 

Book of Mormon prophets
Angel Moroni